Nycerella is a genus of spiders of the jumping spider family, Salticidae.

The genus was renamed from Cyrene Peckham & Peckham, 1893, because the name was preoccupied.

Species
As of June 2017, the World Spider Catalog lists the following species in the genus:
 Nycerella aprica (Peckham & Peckham, 1896) – Brazil, Paraguay, Argentina
 Nycerella decorata (Peckham & Peckham, 1893) – Panama, Colombia, St. Vincent
 Nycerella delecta (Peckham & Peckham, 1896) – Mexico to Panama
 Nycerella donaldi (Chickering, 1946) – Panama
 Nycerella melanopygia Galiano, 1982 – Brazil
 Nycerella neglecta Galiano, 1982 – Panama to Ecuador
 Nycerella sanguinea (Peckham & Peckham, 1896) – Guatemala to Panama
 Nycerella volucripes Galiano, 1982 – Brazil, Peru

References

External links
 Photographs of Nycerella species
 Pictures of N. delecta 
 Paintings of N. delecta
 Pictures of N. donaldi

Salticidae genera
Spiders of North America
Spiders of South America
Salticidae